Colletotrichum glycines is a species of fungus in the family Glomerellaceae. It is a plant pathogen, causing soybean and tomato anthracnose. It is the teleomorph form of Glomerella glycines.

See also
 List of soybean diseases

References

Fungal plant pathogens and diseases
Sordariomycetes enigmatic taxa
Soybean diseases
Fungi described in 1920